John Duncan Anderson  (born 14 November 1956) is an Australian politician and commentator who served as the 11th Deputy Prime Minister of Australia and leader of the National Party from 1999 to 2005. He was a member of the House of Representatives from 1989 to 2007, serving as Minister for Primary Industries and Energy from 1996 to 1998 and Minister for Transport and Regional Development from 1998 to 2005 in the Howard Government.

As a government minister and later deputy prime minister, Anderson had cabinet responsibility for primary industry policy, including transport infrastructure and agricultural water rights. He was a member of Australia's National Security Committee from 1999 to 2005 when it faced the War on terror, in particular the Bali bombings.

After politics, Anderson has been published for his views on civic freedoms, global food security, modern slavery and the economy. In 2017 he launched a web-based interview program, Conversations with John Anderson, featuring interviews with public intellectuals.

Early life and education 
Anderson was born in Sydney to Duncan Anderson, and Beryl Mann. His family had been graziers and landowners of Mullaley in northern New South Wales since the 1840s. His father, Duncan was taken from farming on being called up to serve with the 12/24th Australian Light Horse in 1938. Deployed to North Africa, he commanded a section of three anti-tank guns against the Afrika Korps in the Second Battle of El Alamein in north Africa during World War II. He sustained significant wounds and, Anderson would later say, his father's "body, and mind, bore deep scars. Returning to Australia he married "the Belle of the District" Beryl Mann John was born to them in 1956 and he was joined by a sister, Jane a year later. When he was three years old, his mother died of cancer. In 1970, his younger sister Jane died after Anderson hit a cricket ball into the back of her neck while playing cricket at home with his father. He would later say, "my childhood ended that day."

Anderson has described his religious upbringing as "very, very nominal Presbyterian".

As a young child, Anderson was tutored at home by his aunt, Margaret, through Blackfriars Correspondence School. At age nine, he was sent to board in Gunnedah where he attended Gunnedah South Public School. Anderson was then sent to The King's School in Parramatta, boarding at Waddy House.

He began a degree in arts and laws at the University of Sydney, where he was a resident of St Paul's College, but dropped law shortly after commencing. Anderson graduated with a Bachelor of Arts in history and returned to the family property where he was a farmer and grazier, and completed a Master of Arts during this time.

Early parliamentary career 
Anderson became chair of the National Party's Tambar Springs branch in 1984. A few weeks later, MP Frank O'Keefe recommended Anderson run for the seat of Paterson, where he was current member, but the seat was abolished later that year. In 1989, Ralph Hunt, the sitting MP in the neighbouring seat of Gwydir, retired and supported Anderson to replace him. The ensuing pre-selection contest was close, Anderson defeating several contenders that included future independent MP, Tony Windsor. In the by-election the threat came from right wing candidates John Uebergang, (who would later create the Confederate Action Party of Australia) and an anti-immigration candidate Bevan O’Regan (who would later join One Nation). Anderson won the election with a two-party preferred result of 56%. His first remarks to the House of Representatives were part of a condolence motion for his mentor, and former MP, Frank O'Keefe who had, "encouraged me to pursue a political career, despite the fact that I argued the point with him." In his official maiden speech on 17 August 1989, he centred on conservative values of individual liberty, the value of the family, limited government and "control of our national destiny."

In the 1990 federal election, Anderson lifted his result to 61%. The new coalition leader John Hewson made him Parliamentary Secretary to the Shadow Minister for Industrial Relations, John Howard.

The Coalition was again defeated at the 1993 election, though Anderson was returned with a 2pp result of 60%, and was made deputy leader of the Nationals, defeating three senior candidates – Peter McGauran, John Sharp and Bruce Scott. At the time he was described in The Canberra Times as:"...a young, good-looking man with a long lineage in farming who has been tipped for party leadership ever since he entered politics because he bridges the traditional interests of the former Country Party and its need to update its image for the 1990s". John Hewson appointed Anderson as Shadow Minister for Primary Industry. In the role he criticised the minister Simon Crean on the government-set wool floor price.

Cabinet minister 
In the 1996 Australian federal election, Anderson made an election promise with John Howard for the establishment of a $1 billion fund to restore the national estate, including programs to arrest soil degradation." Anderson won 68.51% in the two party preferred vote for his seat. He was made the Minister for Primary Industries and Energy in the new Government. He was also asked to join a five-person "razor gang" led by Peter Costello with the task of cutting $6 to $8 billion from government expenditure. Anderson advocated that diesel fuel rebates, the Australian Quarantine and Inspection Service and agricultural research and development should be protected from the spending cuts because they "create growth even if they are funded by debt."

Minister for Primary Industries and Energy 
Anderson's three years in the primary industries portfolio were marked by conflict as government protection of primary industries were removed. During this time, the government deregulated the wool, wheat and dairy sectors, and privatised much of the meat and livestock industry. Anderson lead a delegation of Australian business leaders to visit Taiwan in September 1996 in his role as primary industries minister, which the People's Republic of China said contravened the One China policy.

In response to the government-owned Australian Wool Corporation (AWC) being left with a surplus of four million bales of unsold wool and a debt of around $2 billion, Anderson and the Coalition government gave wool producers a pay-out of $300 million, drawing down against their equity in the wool stockpile, despite objections from many National Party members who preferred a policy of freezing sales from the stockpile. The government wool-owning entity was entirely privatised, to become Woolstock Australia, by August 2001.

Anderson announced significant restructures of the meat and livestock industry in 1997, which were supported with some reservations by farmers groups, such as NSW Farmers. In 1998, Meat & Livestock Australia was created from the two organisations, with the goal of becoming a less costly, producer-owned service delivery body.

Minister for Transport and Regional Development 
In September 1997, Anderson assumed the portfolio for Transport and Regional Development, giving him responsibility for developing national rail, road and water infrastructure. Anderson oversaw the creation of the Australian Rail Track Corporation, a Commonwealth body set up to own or hold long-term leases over much of the continental rail network.

In response to criticism over industry deregulation, the privatisation of Telstra and gun control laws, Fischer and Anderson scheduled a party meeting on 5 August 1998 to declare their leadership positions vacant, inviting their party room critics, particularly Bob Katter and De-Anne Kelly, to replace them. In a situation that journalist Michelle Grattant called "bizarre" Anderson and Fischer then nominated for the positions they had vacated and were re-elected unopposed.

During the 1998 federal election, private polling indicated that the threat to his seat would come from the political right, with up to 49% of people in Anderson's seat of Gwydir intended to vote for the new Pauline Hanson's One Nation. Anderson suffered a 16.18% swing against him with a primary vote of just 46.14%, the only time his first round votes were below 50%. Poor results for the National Party across the country prompted Anderson to initiate an inquiry and much soul-searching about its future." Anderson himself believed his constant travel had left regional Australians feeling neglected, saying that, "Politics abhors a vacuum, and we left one. For that I feel I must accept a fair degree of blame".

Deputy prime minister 
Following the resignation of deputy prime minister and Nationals leader Tim Fischer, Anderson was elected unopposed as the new leader and became deputy prime minister himself on 20 July 1999. Anderson kept his ministerial responsibilities in Transport and Regional Development and were extended to the delivery of government services, such as health, to regional and remote centres, and a role in the National Security Committee. Anderson also assumed the role of acting prime minister when John Howard was overseas, such as during the September 11 attacks and in the aftermath of the 2002 Bali bombings.

In 2002, Anderson called for laws making it an offence to desecrate the Australian flag.

Anderson's ministerial department was responsible for paying outstanding wages and entitlements for former employees of the insolvent airline Ansett Australia, though allowing it to collapse.

During Anderson's tenure as deputy prime minister, the Coalition government established the National Water Initiative in 2004, allowing producers to gain ongoing access entitlements for a share of water available for use, rather than fixed-term entitlements with no guarantee of renewal.

On 17 November 2004, the MP for New England, Tony Windsor, accused Anderson of offering him, via businessman Greg Maguire, a diplomatic or trade posting if Windsor would surrender his seat. As the statement was made under parliamentary privilege, it was protected from litigation for defamation. Anderson strongly repudiated the claims. A Senate inquiry and the Commonwealth Director of Public Prosecutions found that there were no grounds to lay any charges under the Commonwealth Electoral Act.

He was also involved in the decision to provide $1 billion in aid following the 2004 Indonesian tsunami, and counts it as one of the government's greatest achievements.

On the last sitting day of Parliament before the winter recess of 2005, Anderson announced his resignation from the leadership of the National Party, and as deputy prime minister, citing a "debilitating but thankfully benign prostate condition". He was succeeded in both positions by Mark Vaile, and retired from parliament at the 2007 federal election.

Later life

Anderson served as chairman of Eastern Star Gas (ESG) from October 2007 until 2011 when the publicly listed company and its flagship Narrabri Gas Project was acquired by Santos in a $924 million deal.

On 13 June 2011, Anderson was named an Officer of the Order of Australia: "For distinguished service to the Parliament of Australia, particularly for supporting rural and regional communities, transport development, and water management initiatives." In June 2022, Anderson was promoted to Companion of the Order of Australia in the 2022 Queen's Birthday Honours for "eminent service to rural and regional development, to leadership in international agricultural research and food security, to social commentary, and through contributions to not-for-profit organisations".

Prior to the 2017 Australian Marriage Law Postal Survey, Anderson was interviewed on ABC television and spoke about his opposition to same-sex marriage.

In the late 2010s, Anderson increased his presence on online media, as well as newspaper opinion pieces and television appearances. He began having opinion pieces published on diverse topics, from civic freedoms to modern slavery. In 2018, Anderson began hosting a podcast and YouTube channel on which he interviews public figures, including historian Victor Davis Hanson, former chief rabbi Jonathan Sacks, former Labor Party leader Kim Beazley, Jonathan Haidt, Glenn Loury, Niall Ferguson, and psychologist Jordan Peterson.

In March 2021, Anderson declared himself a candidate in the National Party's pre-selection for Senate candidacy at the 2022 federal election. In June, Anderson was beaten by former party director Ross Cadell, 42 votes to 39, for the top spot on the Nationals' New South Wales Senate ticket, and hence the second place on the joint Coalition Senate ticket. Anderson declined to run for the second spot, which was deemed unwinnable, and declared his political career had come to an end.

Personal life 

In January 1998, Anderson's wife Julia gave birth to their fifth child. The child was diagnosed with Down Syndrome and Hirschsprung's disease and died six months later.

References

External links

Officialc website

1956 births
Living people
Australian monarchists
Companions of the Order of Australia
Deputy Prime Ministers of Australia
Members of the Cabinet of Australia
National Party of Australia members of the Parliament of Australia
Members of the Australian House of Representatives for Gwydir
Members of the Australian House of Representatives
People educated at The King's School, Parramatta
Delegates to the Australian Constitutional Convention 1998
20th-century Australian politicians
University of Sydney alumni
Leaders of the National Party of Australia
21st-century Australian politicians
Government ministers of Australia